Khop is a district of Sainyabuli province, Laos.

References 

Khop

Districts of Laos